Port Grimaud is a seaside town that forms part of the commune of Grimaud in the Var department of the Provence-Alpes-Côte d'Azur region in southeastern France. It is located seven km (four mi) west of Saint-Tropez and seven km southwest of Sainte-Maxime. This seaside town was created by architect François Spoerry in the 1960s by modifying the marshes of the river Giscle on the bay of Saint-Tropez. Built with channels in a Venetian manner, but with French "fisherman"-style houses resembling those in Saint-Tropez, Spoerry called his style "L'architecture douce".

The town is also known as the "Venice of Provence".

The mostly traffic-free town is popular with boat owners, as most properties include their own berth. The success of the first phase of the development meant that Port Grimaud 2 (extending the town further east) was completed in the 1970s and Port Grimaud 3 in the 1990s. 

The local church, the L'eglise œcuménique Saint-François d’Assise (the Ecumenical Church of St Francis of Assisi) in the Place de L'église (Church Square), was also designed by Spoerry and contains stained glass by Victor Vasarely.

References

External links 

 Association for informing owners and protecting their interests: http://www.port-grimaud-info.com
 Discover Port Grimaud

Var (department)